New World was an Australian pop band formed in Brisbane, Queensland in 1965. They are best known for their top 10 hit single, "Tom-Tom Turnaround", which was released in 1971. Most of their biggest successes were written by Nicky Chinn and Mike Chapman.

Career
The band was founded in Brisbane, Queensland in 1965, by John "Fuzzy" Lee, Mel Noonan and Robert Elford, and were billed as The New World Trio. In 1968, John Kane joined the group, and by the end of the decade they were a popular act.

At the beginning of the 1970s, songwriters Nicky Chinn and Mike Chapman booked the group on television. They also took the band to Europe, where record label owner Mickie Most signed them immediately to his imprint RAK. Their first single for RAK was a cover of Billy Joe Royal’s "Rose Garden", which hit number 15 on the UK Singles Chart in 1971. A version of "Rose Garden" by country singer Lynn Anderson, released in late 1970, was an international number one hit single.

The group's biggest hit was a version of "Tom-Tom Turnaround", also recorded by the Sweet. This was followed by "Kara, Kara", which was a hit in the United Kingdom and Germany; although a German language version of the tune was a bigger hit for Peter Orloff. They had a fourth hit in the United Kingdom with "Sister Jane", but their next release, "Living Next Door to Alice", was a flop. However, this song would later become a worldwide hit for Smokie in 1976.

In the early 1970s, New World were musical guests on the BBC shows, The Two Ronnies in 1971 and The Morecambe and Wise Show in 1973. In 1973 New World for the first time on live performances had a three piece backing band consisting of Brian Willoughby (ex Strawbs) on guitar, Alan Wood on bass and Roy Simmonite on drums who both went on the become members of Jimmy James and The Vagabonds. 

The group appeared on the British talent show Opportunity Knocks. They were at the centre of a trial over alleged fixing of the results of the show.  The events were covered in John G. Lee's March 2005 book, New World Guilty: Vice and Payola Scandals Oust Watergate.

New World's last releases were issued in 1976.

Discography

Albums

Singles

References

Australian pop music groups
Musical groups from Brisbane
Musical groups established in 1965
Musical groups disestablished in 1976